St Nicholas' Church in Brockley, Somerset, England dates from the 12th century, and is recorded in the National Heritage List for England as a designated Grade II* listed building.  The church is a redundant church in the care of the Churches Conservation Trust.  It was vested in the Trust on 1 April 1989.

The Norman church has a pinnacled tower which was added in the 15th century, and the whole church was extensively renovated in the 1820s by the Pigott family,. The font is Norman and there is a stone pulpit dating from around 1480. Inside the church is a Royal Coat of Arms dating from 1842 by William Edkins.

The building is used as a local arts venue with service generally being held in the church twice a year, however special permission can be obtained for weddings.

See also
 List of churches preserved by the Churches Conservation Trust in South West England
 List of ecclesiastical parishes in the Diocese of Bath and Wells

References

External links

12th-century church buildings in England
Church of England church buildings in North Somerset
Grade II* listed churches in Somerset
Grade II* listed buildings in North Somerset
Churches preserved by the Churches Conservation Trust
Former churches in Somerset